Artifodina strigulata is a moth of the family Gracillariidae. It is known from Meghalaya, India, and from Nepal.

The wingspan is 8.2-11.5 mm.

The larvae feed on Myrsine capitellata. They mine the leaves of their host plant. In early stages, the mine is narrow, linear, interparenchymal, and runs across the leaf from one edge to another twice or thrice, thus the leaf apical to the crossed mines is always discoloured into pale green or yellowish-green. Then, the mine enters into the main leaf-vein towards the apex or runs along the main vein. Sometimes it irregularly runs on the space between the edge and the main vein. In late stages, the mine is broadened into a large, blotchy one of the full-depth type within the discoloured area of the leaf. This type of mine seems to be made by the larvae of tissue-feeding form. Finally, a semitransparent, blotchy mine is seen on the discoloured apical area of the leaf. When full grown, the larva becomes ochre-yellowish with a crimson-reddish, broad, transverse band on each segment, and leaves the mine to pupate through a semicircular slit on the upper surface of the leaf. The cocoon is boat-shaped, with a few bubbles on the surface.

References

Gracillariinae
Moths of Asia
Moths described in 1985